Rabbinical degree could mean:

 Bachelor of Talmudic Law
 Master of Rabbinic Studies